The A15 is an Italian autostrada (motorway) connecting Parma and La Spezia through the valleys of the Taro and Magra Rivers. The road is also known as Autostrada della Cisa because it crosses the Northern Apennines at the Cisa pass. The main 101-km expanse of the motorway connects the A1 with the A12 (Genoa-Rosignano Marittimo), thus directly linking the Po Valley with the Italian Riviera and the Versilia region.

The toll road is operated by the company Autocamionale della Cisa S.p.A. The franchisee's current toll charges are: car or motorcycle, €10.40; Overheight vehicle (>1.3m),  €10.70; 3 Axles, €14.40; 4 Axles, €22.70; 5 or more Axles, €26.30.

At the 9-km mark, drivers are welcomed by a curious monument, a tuft of steel and cement sculpted by Luigi Magnani and placed in the traffic island between the two carriageways. The monument is visible to motorists coming from the A1.

History 
The first phase of this motorway, dating to the 1950s, was designed to provide an alternative route between the Po Valley and the coastal Tyrrhenian Sea. The construction required several viaducts and tunnels to attain the maximum altitude of 745 metres above sea level at the entrance of the tunnel crossing. Built as a dual carriageway (divided highway), it is very curvilinear and challenging to drive and, therefore, has long been used for testing new heavy duty vehicles.

Except for short stretches of the highway, the road surface is not porous or fitted with storm drains, making it difficult to negotiate during heavy rain.

Route
The motorway begins from the A1, near Parma. From the Parma Ovest (West Parma) exit the highway climbs through the Taro Valley with exits to Fornovo di Taro, Borgotaro and the village of Berceto, all within the Emilia-Romagna region. After traversing the tunnel, the highway continues into  Tuscany, with exits to Pontremoli and Aulla. Shortly after entering Liguria it intersects the A12 at Santo Stefano di Magra, a few kilometres from La Spezia.

There are five service stations and rest areas along the way.

Provincial Abbreviations: PR = Parma; MS = Massa-Carrera; SP = La Spezia

Proposed construction
A plan to extend the motorway route to the north through Fontevivo, Martignana di Po and Nogarole Rocca, linking to the A22 (the Autobrennero) around Verona, has been proposed. Land has been secured both for straightening the present route through the construction of new viaducts and tunnels and for the proposed extension. The town of Villafranca in Lunigiana and neighbouring municipalities have petitioned for opening such a new toll motorway. Negotiations have begun with private motorway companies and the Ministry of Infrastructure and Transport.

External links 
 Autocisa S.p.A.
 Autostrade maps

Notes

A15
Transport in Emilia-Romagna
Transport in Liguria